Clement King (born 15 September 1874, date of death unknown) was a cricketer from British Guiana. He played in sixteen first-class matches for British Guiana from 1894 to 1905.

See also
 List of Guyanese representative cricketers

References

External links
 

1874 births
Year of death missing
Cricketers from British Guiana